Two Point Mountain refers to one of these mountain peaks:
Two Point Mountain (Idaho) - highest summit of the Boise Mountains
Two Point Mountain (Washington)

References